Abdul Khaleque Mondal (born 1 August 1944) is a Bangladesh Jamaat-e-Islami politician and a former Jatiya Sangsad member representing the  Satkhira-2  constituency during 2001–2006. On 24 March 2022, he was sentenced to death for war crime charges.

Early life 
Mondal was born on 1 August 1944 in Khalilnagar, Baikari Union, Satkhira to Chan Mandal and Diljan Bibi. He passed Kamil from madrasa in 1965 and passed BA from Satkhira Government College in 1969. He later earned a master's degree in Islamic studies from the University of Dhaka.

Career 
Mondal was the principal of Agardari Kamil Madrasa in Satkhira. He was associated with the then student organization Islami Chhatra Sangha of Jamaat-e-Islami. He was associated with the then student organization Islami Chhatra Sangha of Jamaat-e-Islami. He was the Amir of Jamaat's Satkhira district and a member of the Central Majlis Shura. He was elected to the parliament representing the Satkhira-2 constituency as a Bangladesh Jamaat-e-Islami candidate in 2001. He lost the election in 2008 to the Jatiya Party candidate M. A. Jabbar.

War crimes and convictions 
The Daily Star accused him of supporting Ahle Hadith Andolon Bangladesh, an extremist group.

In July 2009, Nazrul Islam Gazi from Shimulbarhia village filed a case against Mondal for killing his father Rustam Ali during the 1971 Bangladesh Liberation War.

Mandal was arrested on 16 June 2015 at a madrasa at Sadar Upazila on charges of planning to orchestrate violence. On 21 August, he was shown arrested in the war crime charges investigated at the International Crimes Tribunal.

On 24 March 2022, Mondal was sentenced to death for the war crime charges against humanity, including murder, rape, detention and torture. He had served in the paramilitary Razakar unit during the war.

References

1944 births
Living people
Satkhira Government College alumni
University of Dhaka alumni
People from Satkhira District
Bangladesh Jamaat-e-Islami politicians
8th Jatiya Sangsad members
Bangladeshi politicians convicted of crimes
Prisoners and detainees of Bangladesh
Bengali Muslim scholars of Islam